The Euro-Med Challenge is an international rugby league football competition. The competition is organized by the Rugby League European Federation and is designed to promote the sport of rugby league in Europe and the Mediterranean Region. The Euro Med Challenge is a second or third tier competition for European rugby league teams.

Because of its place as a developmental competition, it is not always contested by the same nations. In 2008, it was contested among Russia, Serbia and Lebanon.  All three of these teams, however, were promoted to the European Cup in 2009, so three new teams were selected for the 2009 installment: Morocco, Belgium and Catalonia.

2008

Russia won the 2008 tournament, which was expected to hinge on the Russia-Lebanon game. However, many of the Lebanese players could not obtain visas to travel to Russia in time for the match. This resulted in one-sided scoreline in Russia's favour and handed them the tournament.

Results

Standings

2009
In 2009, the RLEF announced that Russia, Lebanon and Serbia would be promoted to a revamped European Nations Cup. The Euro-Med Challenge was therefore contested by three new teams in 2009 – Belgium and Catalonia, who made their competitive debuts, and Morocco.  Belgium recorded their first international win, beating Catalonia in game 2 of the tournament, but the experienced Moroccan team won the competition.

Results

Standings

See also

References

External links
 Official RLEF Website
 Highlights video: Catalonia-Morocco
 Highlights video: Belgium-Catalonia

European rugby league competitions